Fruzhin Peak is the peak rising to 1350 m in the south part of Petvar Heights, southeast Sentinel Range in Ellsworth Mountains, Antarctica.  It overlooks Hudman Glacier to the west and Carey Glacier to the east.

The peak is named after the Bulgarian prince and military commander Fruzhin (14-15th century).

Location
US mapping in 1961, updated in 1988.

See also
 Mountains in Antarctica

Maps
 Vinson Massif.  Scale 1:250 000 topographic map.  Reston, Virginia: US Geological Survey, 1988.
 Antarctic Digital Database (ADD). Scale 1:250000 topographic map of Antarctica. Scientific Committee on Antarctic Research (SCAR). Since 1993, regularly updated.

Notes

References
 Fruzhin Peak. SCAR Composite Antarctic Gazetteer.
 Bulgarian Antarctic Gazetteer. Antarctic Place-names Commission. (details in Bulgarian, basic data in English)

External links
 Fruzhin Peak. Copernix satellite image

Bulgaria and the Antarctic
Ellsworth Mountains
Mountains of Ellsworth Land